is a Japanese dancer and actress. She is a former member of the groups E-girls and Flower. She left both groups in 2013 in order to pursue an acting career. She was formerly the leader of Flower.

Career

Movies

TV dramas

Groups

References

External links
 Official profile at LDH

1993 births
Living people
Japanese child actresses
Japanese female dancers
Japanese television actresses
Japanese women pop singers
LDH (company) artists
21st-century Japanese singers
21st-century Japanese women singers